This portion of National Register of Historic Places listings in Puerto Rico covers the eastern region of Puerto Rico, from Carolina in the northeast to Arroyo in the southeast. It also includes the islands of Culebra and Vieques.

Names of places given are as appear in the National Register, reflecting name as given in NRHP application at the date of listing. Note, the National Register name system does not accommodate Spanish á, ñ and other letters.

Arroyo

|}

Canóvanas 

|}

Carolina 

|}

Ceiba 

|}

Culebra 

|}

Fajardo 

|}

Humacao 

|}

Las Piedras 

|}

Loíza 

|}

Luquillo 

|}

Maunabo 

|}

Naguabo 

|}

Patillas

|}

Río Grande 

|}

Vieques 

|}

Yabucoa 

|}

See also

National Register of Historic Places listings in Puerto Rico
 National Register of Historic Places listings in southern Puerto Rico
 National Register of Historic Places listings in northern Puerto Rico
 National Register of Historic Places listings in western Puerto Rico
 National Register of Historic Places listings in central Puerto Rico
 National Register of Historic Places listings in San Juan, Puerto Rico
History of Puerto Rico

Notes

References

External links

Puerto Rico State Historic Preservation Office, National Register of Historic Places site
National Park Service, National Register of Historic Places site

Eastern